Blending Times is Ravi Coltrane's fifth album as a band leader, and second for Savoy Records.

Five of the tracks on this album are group improvisations "conceived and directed by Ravi Coltrane" that don't follow a standard time signature or preset measures lengths, reminiscent of free jazz popularized by Ornette Coleman.

The album's final track, "For Turiya", is a eulogy for Alice Coltrane, Ravi's mother, the wife of John Coltrane and a musician in her own right, who died during the album's recording.

Blending Times reached 36 on Billboard's Jazz Albums Chart, his second time making the chart.

Track listing
All compositions by Ravi Coltrane, except where noted
"Shine" (Luis Perdomo) – 5:49
"First Circuit" – 3:45
"A Still Life" – 6:17
"Epistrophy" (Kenny Clarke, Thelonious Monk) – 7:48
"Amalgams" – 4:18
"Narcined" – 4:49
"One Wheeler Will" (Ralph Alessi) – 7:31
"The Last Circuit" – 4:18
"Before With After" – 2:49
"For Turiya" (Charlie Haden) – 9:03

Personnel
Musicians
Ravi Coltrane – direction, production, tenor saxophone
Drew Gress – double bass
Charlie Haden – double bass, guest artist
Luis Perdomo – piano
Brandee Younger - harp, guest artist

Technicians, producing, & others
Brian Dozoretz - engineer
Steve Genewick – mixing
Jimmy Katz - photography
Joe Marciano – engineer
Anna M. Sala - associate producer
Joshua Sherman - executive producer
Allan Tucker – mastering

Recording notes
Tracks 2,4,5,8: recorded at Bennett's Studio, Engelwood, NJ, August 14 & 15, 2006 
Track 3: recorded at Systems II, Brooklyn, NY, February 27, 2007 
Tracks 1,6,7,9: recorded at Bennett's Studio, Engelwood, NJ, August 20–22, 2007 
Track 10: recorded at Capitol Studios, Los Angeles, CA, September 17, 2007 
Mixed at Capitol Studios, May, 2008 
Mastered at TuckerSound, NYC, September, 2008

References

2009 albums
Ravi Coltrane albums